Helladia may refer to:
 Helladia (beetle), a genus
 Helladia (stage artist), 5th-century Roman pantomime performer